Anna-Christina Ragger ( Kopinits, born 1 April 1985) is an Austrian chess player. She received the FIDE titles of FIDE Master (FM) in 2017 and Woman International Master (WIM) in 2009. Her highest rating was 2306 (in November 2018) and she is ranked 4th female player in Austria.

She is the Austrian woman national champion 7 times in the years: 2003, 2006–2009, 2012, and 2017.

References

External links 
 
 
 

1985 births
Living people
Austrian female chess players
Chess FIDE Masters
Chess Woman International Masters